Let's Dance – Let's Christmas was a Christmas special show of the german dance competition Let's Dance. The show was broadcast in 2 live shows on December 20 and 21, 2013, on RTL. The judges were Jorge Gonzalez, Motsi Mabuse and Joachim Llambi. The hosts were Daniel Hartwich and Sylvie Meis.

Under the motto "Let's Dance – Let's Christmas", five former participants competed against each other in this two-part special edition. As announced on November 12, these were all previous season winners with the exception of Wayne Carpendale and Maite Kelly. Kelly was originally scheduled for the show, but canceled its participation due to scheduling reasons, which is why it was replaced by Moritz A. Sachs. The premium for the winner was fed to a good cause.

Couples

Scoring chart

Red numbers indicates the lowest score for each week.
Green numbers indicates the highest score for each week.
 indicates the couple eliminated that week.
 indicates the returning couple that finished in the bottom three.
 indicates the winning couple.
 indicates the runner-up couple.
 indicates the third-place couple.

Averages
This table only counts for dances scored on a traditional 30-points scale.

Highest and lowest scoring performances
The best and worst performances in each dance according to the judges' 30-point scale are as follows:

Weekly scores and songs
Unless indicated otherwise, individual judges scores in the charts below (given in parentheses) are listed in this order from left to right: Jorge Gonzalez, Motsi Mabuse, Joachim Llambi.

Show 1: December 20, 2013

Running order

Show 2: December 21, 2013

Running order

References

Let's Dance (German TV series)
German music television series
German reality television series
2013 German television series debuts
2013 German television seasons
German-language television shows
RTL (German TV channel) original programming